Robert E. O'Neill is an American attorney who served as the United States Attorney for the Middle District of Florida from 2010 to 2013.

References

Living people
United States Attorneys for the Middle District of Florida
Florida Democrats
Year of birth missing (living people)